The American Indian Scouting Association (AISA) is a joint venture of the Boy Scouts of America (BSA) and the Girl Scouts of the USA (GSUSA). The AISA began as a committee of concerned Boy Scout Scoutmasters in 1956 and was sponsored by the Bureau of Indian Affairs in Los Alamos, New Mexico.

AISA holds an annual seminar, which began in 1957, is run by a volunteer steering committee and is hosted by a local tribe or Indian community. The seminar was developed in order to attract both Indians and non-Indians and foster understanding of Indian culture and Scouting. Youth participation in this seminar began in 1975.

References
BSA American Indian Scouting Association website
Scouting magazine AISA article
49th American Indian Boy Scouting/Girl Scouting Seminar

Associations related to the Boy Scouts of America
Girl Scouts of the USA
Native American organizations
1956 establishments in the United States
Youth organizations established in 1956
United States Bureau of Indian Affairs
Native American history of New Mexico